In Cook Islands mythology of the southern Cook Islands group, the earth goddess Papa was created when Varima-te-takere, the primordial mother goddess, plucked her out from the left side of her body. Papa married her brother, the sky god Vatea. They had twin sons, the sea god Tangaroa and the vegetation god Rongo.

See also
Rangi and Papa, in Māori mythology
Papahānaumoku, Earth goddess in Hawaiian mythology

References

Mangaia mythology
Cook Islands mythology
Earth goddesses